The 1917 American Cup was the annual open cup held by the American Football Association. Thirty-six teams entered the competition however none of the major Massachusetts teams entered. A new rule that season made by the Southern New England FA forbade their clubs from entering more than one tournament other than the State Cup. This being the case most of the teams opted for the National Cup instead. Bethlehem Steel brought home the trophy for the third time with a convincing 7-0 final win against the West Hudsons.

American Cup Bracket

Final

See also

1917 National Challenge Cup

References

Amer
American Cup